Ezekiel Whitman (March 9, 1776 – August 1, 1866) was a Representative from Maine, both when it was the District of Maine within Massachusetts and after it became an independent state. He was born in East Bridgewater in the Province of Massachusetts Bay on March 9, 1776. He  graduated from Brown University in 1795. He studied law, was admitted to the bar and practiced in New Gloucester, Maine and in Portland, Maine (both communities a district of Massachusetts until 1820).

He was an unsuccessful candidate for election in 1806 to the Tenth Congress. He was elected as a Federalist from Massachusetts to the Eleventh Congress (March 4, 1809 – March 3, 1811). He was a member of the executive council in 1815 and 1816.  He was elected to the Fifteenth and Sixteenth Congresses (March 4, 1817 – March 3, 1821).  Whitman was a delegate to the convention in 1819 that framed the first State constitution of Maine. He was elected to the Seventeenth Congress from Maine and served from March 4, 1821, to June 1, 1822, when he resigned.

He served as a judge of the court of common pleas of Maine 1822-1841.  He was an unsuccessful candidate for election in 1838 to the Twenty-sixth Congress.  Whitman served as chief justice of the Maine Supreme Judicial Court 1841-1848.  He retired in 1852 and returned to East Bridgewater, Massachusetts where he died on August 1, 1866.

References

 

Members of the United States House of Representatives from Maine
Members of the United States House of Representatives from the District of Maine
Chief Justices of the Maine Supreme Judicial Court
Brown University alumni
People from New Gloucester, Maine
People from East Bridgewater, Massachusetts
Maine Federalists
Politicians from Portland, Maine
Federalist Party members of the United States House of Representatives from Massachusetts
1776 births
1866 deaths
People of colonial Massachusetts
Maine lawyers
Massachusetts lawyers
19th-century American lawyers